USS Arctic is the name of several ships of the U.S. Navy:

 , a screw steamer built by the Philadelphia Navy Yard
 Ice Boat No. 3, an 1873 municipal icebreaker briefly commissioned as the patrol vessel USS Arctic in the Spanish–American War
 , a 1913 tugboat used as a convoy escort in World War I
 , an Arctic-class stores ship which saw service in World War II
 , a fast combat support ship, commissioned as USS Arctic from 1995 to 2002 

United States Navy ship names